Savitri Bai Phule (born 1 January 1981) is an Indian politician and president of the Kanshiram Bahujan Samaj Party (KBSP). She was elected to the state assembly in 2012 from Balha in Bahraich district as a candidate of Bharatiya Janata Party. She contested 2014 Lok Sabha election from Bahraich and became member of 16th Lok Sabha.

On 7 September 2015, Phule filed a complaint against an official from the Dilip Buildcon company over casteist remarks and threatening her with dire consequences.

Personal life

Savitribai was born on 1 January 1981 in a Buddhist family at Nanpara in Bahraich district, Uttar Pradesh. She studied at Dr. Ram Manohar Lohia Avadh University. She is influenced by Babasaheb Ambedkar and Gautama Buddha. She follows Buddhism and wears saffron cloths as a symbol of Buddhism.

Political career
She was elected to the state assembly in 2012 from Balha in Bahraich district as a candidate of Bharatiya Janata Party. She contested 2014 Lok Sabha election from Bahraich and became member of 16th Lok Sabha.

She quit BJP on 6 December 2018 stating "Party Trying To Divide Society", Her action comes after the Uttar Pradesh Chief Minister Yogi Adityanath's comment on Hanuman’s caste and joined Indian National Congress on 2 March 2019.
She contested 2019 general elections from Bahraich parliamentary constituency as an Indian National Congress candidate. She got 34454 votes and lost the seat to Akshaibar Lal of Bhartiya Janta Party.

In January 2020, Phule founded Kanshiram Bahujan Samaj Party (KBSP).

References

Living people
India MPs 2014–2019
Members of the Uttar Pradesh Legislative Assembly
People from Bahraich district
Lok Sabha members from Uttar Pradesh
Women in Uttar Pradesh politics
20th-century Buddhists
21st-century Buddhists
Indian Buddhists
Bharatiya Janata Party politicians from Uttar Pradesh
21st-century Indian women politicians
21st-century Indian politicians
1981 births